Rayudugaru Nayudugaru is a 1996 Telugu-language action-drama film, produced and directed by Dasari Narayana Rao under the Dasari Film University banner. It stars Akkineni Nageswara Rao, Dasari Narayana Rao, Vinod Kumar and Roja, with music composed by M. M. Keeravani.

Plot
The film revolves around two villages, Rayudupallem & Nayudupallem situated on either side of the Godavari which is brimful with love, joy & affection. In virtue of the friendship affiliated with its lead-off persons Rayudu (Akkineni Nageswara Rao) & Nayudu (Dasari Narayana Rao). All is well until malicious Veera Swamy (Satyanarayana) returns the village who wants to take avenge against Rayudu & Nayudu for ostracizing him 14 years. In the past, Veera Swamy is a huge landlord, his daughter loves & marries a lower cast guy for which Rayudu's wife Parvathi (Jaya Sudha) supports. As a result, heinous Veera Swamy slaughters Parvathi and he is punished. Now Veera Swamy ploys to couple up Rayudu's daughter Malli (Roja) with Nayudu's son Satyam Naidu (Srihari), who has been affected by AIDS. Even Malli is already in love with a village guy Ramudu (Vinod Kumar) they sacrifice their love for the welfare of the villages. Just before the marriage, Nayudu's wife Lakshmi (Sujatha) learns the truth, so, she seeks Rayudu to stop the marriage and maintain secrecy. As she is panic-stricken about her husband's anger. Right now, Rayudu does so accordingly which misfires. Veera Swamy exploits the situation by creating disputes between Rayudu & Nayudu and the rivalry spreads between the villages too. So, Rayudu decides to couple up Malli with Satyam to stop the violence. Ultimately, Lakshmi decides to reveal the truth when Veera Swamy obstructs her way. Thereupon, Rayudu lands and slays out Veera Swamy. Meanwhile, Nayudu is cognizant of reality through Satyam's classmate (Ravali), so, he knocks out his son. Finally, the movie ends on a happy note with the marriage of Ramudu & Malli and the reunion of two villages.

Cast

Akkineni Nageswara Rao as Rayudu / Gudavalli Sarva Rayudu
Dasari Narayana Rao as Nayudu / Addamala Rangaiah Nayudu
Vinod Kumar as Ramudu / Sivaramakrishna Prasad 
Roja as Malli / Malleswari 
Satyanarayana as Veera Swamy
Srihari as Satyam Nayudu
Babu Mohan as Gongali
A.V.S
Rallapalli as Chebrolu
Chalapathi Rao as Munusabu
Narra Venkateswara Rao as Mavullaiah
Jayasudha as Parvathi
Sujatha as Lakshmi
Jayanthi  as Veera Swamy's wife 
Ravali
Annuja
Master Baladitya as Bulli Rayudu

Soundtrack

Music composed by M. M. Keeravani. Music released on Supreme Music Company.

References

Indian action drama films
Films directed by Dasari Narayana Rao
Films scored by M. M. Keeravani
1990s action drama films
1996 drama films
1996 films
1990s Telugu-language films